Yide Lu Station is a station on Line 6 of the Guangzhou Metro located in the Yuexiu District of Guangzhou. It began operation on 28 January 2015.

Station layout

Exits

Exits

References 

Railway stations in China opened in 2015
Guangzhou Metro stations in Yuexiu District